Domenico Menotti Garibaldi (16 September 1840 – 22 August 1903) was an Italian soldier and politician who was the eldest son of Giuseppe Garibaldi and Anita Garibaldi. He fought in the Second and Third wars of Italian Unification, and organized the Garibaldi Legion, a unit of Italian volunteers who fought for Polish independence in the January Uprising of 1863. He also served in the Chamber of Deputies.

Biography
Garibaldi was born on 16 September 1840 in Mostardas, in Rio Grande do Sul, southern Brazil, to Anita and Giuseppe Garibaldi, as their first son and the only born in Brazil. At the time of his birth Mostardas was part of the revolutionary Riograndense Republic, for which his parents were fighting in the Farroupilha Revolution. He was named after his grandfather, Domenico Garibaldi, and the Italian patriot Ciro Menotti, whom Giuseppe Garibaldi considered a martyr.

After Anita's death in 1849, Garibaldi had a mixed upbringing, alternating between his paternal grandmother and Augusto Garibaldi, a cousin of his father, in Nice, then at his father's home in Caprera after 1856. He was partly educated at a military school in Genoa. In 1859, aged 19, Garibaldi joined his father's newly formed legion of Redshirts, the Hunters of the Alps, created to assist Piedmont-Sardinia against Austria in the Second Italian War of Independence. He took part in the Expedition of the Thousand against the Kingdom of the Two Sicilies, in 1860, during which he was wounded at the Battle of Calatafimi. In late May, Garibaldi was sent to watch the surrender of Sicilian general Lanza after the Siege of Palermo.

In August 1862, he was present at the controversial Battle of Aspromonte, when both Menotti and Giuseppe Garibaldi were wounded in an attack by Italian troops. In 1863, during the January Uprising in Poland, Garibaldi organized a legion of Italian volunteers, the Garibaldi Legion, led by general Francesco Nullo, to support the Polish insurgents in the fight against the Russian Empire. He accompanied his father in a trip to London in 1864. Two years later, during the Third Italian War of Independence, Garibaldi fought alongside his brother Ricciotti, father and brother-in-law at the Battle of Bezzecca, which resulted in a victory over Austrian troops. His own military skill was recognised in 1867, when his father asked him to lead volunteers in an invasion of the Papal States, which ended in defeat at the Battle of Mentana.

Garibaldi was made a general in the new army of unified Italy. In the Franco-Prussian War (1870–1871) he commanded the 3rd brigade of the Army of the Vosges, a volunteer force led by Giuseppe in support of France, and took part in the Battle of Dijon. After the war he became a member of the Chamber of Deputies, and tried to raise an Italian legion to support the ʻUrabi revolt in Egypt. He died in Rome on 22 August 1903.

Family tree

See also 
Ricciotti Garibaldi

References

Bibliography 
 Marco Formato, Menotti Garibaldi. Un eroe di due mondi, Paolo Sorba Editore (2015).
 Antonio Fappani, La Campagna garibaldina del 1866 in Valle Sabbia e nelle Giudicarie, Brescia 1970.

1840 births
1903 deaths
People from Rio Grande do Sul
Italian people of Brazilian descent
People of the Second Italian War of Independence
Members of the Expedition of the Thousand
People of the Third Italian War of Independence
People of the Franco-Prussian War
Italian generals
Members of the Chamber of Deputies (Kingdom of Italy)
Garibaldi family
Italian Freemasons